Shabkar Tsokdruk Rangdrol (Tib. ཞབས་དཀར་ཚོགས་དྲུག་རང་གྲོལ་, Wylie. zhabs dkar tshogs drug rang grol) (1781-1851) was a Tibetan Buddhist yogi and poet from Amdo. Shabkar's yogic and poetic skill is considered second only to Milarepa.

Shabkar began his spiritual practice early, completing a one-year retreat at the age of 16, later becoming a Gelug monk at 20. Shabkar studied with masters of all major Tibetan Buddhist schools including Gelug and Nyingma, and received Dzogchen teachings from his main root guru Chögyal Ngakgi Wangpo. He spent years in solitary retreats in various caves, woods and mountains of Tibet.

Shabkar's works express non-sectarian ideals similar to those of the 19th century Rimé movement, even though he predates the movement by about three decades and never met with any of the Rime masters from Kham. Shabkar also held that even non-Buddhist religions are manifestations of the Buddhas:

Thus, one should know all the tenets of the religions of Buddhism and non-Buddhism—for example, other religions, Bönpos, the Chan Buddhists, the Nyingma, the Kagyus, the Sakya, the Geluks, and so forth—to be the emanations of the buddhas and bodhisattvas.

Shabkar was a prolific writer with his collected works running into several volumes. One of his key works is a series of poems on trekchö and tögal, Khading Shoklap—Flight of the Garuda which has become an important text in the Nyingma Nyingthig tradition.

He also wrote a spiritual autobiography in mixed prose and verse, which is considered one of the lengthiest and most masterful of the Tibetan namtar literature.

Shabkar also wrote works promoting vegetarianism and compassion for animals.

Writings
Song of the View of the Thorough Cut of Luminosity Great Completion Called "Flight of the Garuda Capable of Quickly Traversing All the Levels and Paths". 
The King of Wish-granting Jewels That Fulfills the Hopes of all Fortunate Disciples who Seek liberation, the detailed narration of the life and liberation of the great vajra-holder Shabkar, refuge and protector for all sentient beings of this Dark Age.
The Torch That Illuminates the Graded Path 
The Beneficial Sun, A Dharma Discourse 
The Beneficial Moon, The Beneficial Jewel and The Offering Cloud of Samantabhadra 
The Emanated Scriptures of the Kadampas
The Emanated Scriptures of Manjushri
The Emanated Scriptures of the Bodhisattva
The Marvelous Emanated Scriptures 
The Amazing Emanated Scriptures 
The Wondrous Emanated Scriptures 
The Emanated Scriptures of Pure Vision
The Emanated Scriptures of Orgyen
The Mountains of Gold
The Stream of Ambrosia, An Excellent Discourse
The Self-Arising Sun
The Emanated Scriptures of Compassion

See also
Keith Dowman

References

Further reading
Matthieu Ricard, 'The Writings of Zhabs dkar Tshogs drug Rang grol (1781-1851): A Descriptive Catalogue' in Ramon N. Prats ed. The Pandita and the Siddha: Tibetan Studies in Honour of E. Gene Smith, New Delhi: Amnye Machen, 2007 (also published as The Writings of Shabkar, Shechen Publications, 2005)
Shabkar Tsogdruk Rangdrol, The Life of Shabkar: The Autobiography of a Tibetan Yogin, translated by Matthieu Ricard, SUNY, 1994
Shabkar, Food of Bodhisattvas: Buddhist Teachings on Abstaining from Meat, Shambhala, 2004
Shabkar Tsokdruk Rangdrol, Songs of Shabkar, translated by Victoria Sujata, published by Dharma Publishing, 2011.

External links

Translations by Lotsawa House
Flight of the Garuda by Keith Dowman
Matthieu Ricard Keeping a Veggie Diet (shabkar.org)

18th-century lamas
19th-century lamas
Bodhisattvas
Scholars of Buddhism from Tibet
History of Tibet
Tibetan Buddhist yogis
Kagyu lamas
Nyingma lamas
Mahasiddhas
Tibetan Buddhism writers
Tibetan Buddhists from Tibet
Tibetan poets
Buddhist yogis
19th-century Tibetan people
18th-century Tibetan people
Vegetarianism activists